A coalition government is a form of government in which political parties cooperate to form a government. The usual reason for such an arrangement is that no single party has achieved an absolute majority after an election, an atypical outcome in nations with majoritarian electoral systems, but common under proportional representation. A coalition government might also be created in a time of national difficulty or crisis (for example, during wartime or economic crisis) to give a government the high degree of perceived political legitimacy or collective identity, it can also play a role in diminishing internal political strife. In such times, parties have formed all-party coalitions (national unity governments, grand coalitions). If a coalition collapses, the Prime Minister and cabinet may be ousted by a vote of no confidence, call snap elections, form a new majority coalition, or continue as a minority government.

Coalition agreement

In multi-party states, a coalition agreement is an agreement negotiated between the parties that form a coalition government. It codifies the most important shared goals and objectives of the cabinet. It is often written by the leaders of the parliamentary parties.

Distribution

Countries which often operate with coalition cabinets include: the Nordic countries, the Benelux countries, Australia, Austria, Brazil, Cyprus, France, Germany, Greece, India, Indonesia, Ireland, Israel, Italy, Japan, Kenya, Kosovo, Latvia, Lebanon, Lithuania, Nepal, New Zealand, Pakistan, Thailand, Spain, Trinidad and Tobago, Turkey and Ukraine. Switzerland has been ruled by a coalition of the four strongest parties in parliament from 1959 to 2008, called the "Magic Formula". Between 2010 and 2015, the United Kingdom also operated a formal coalition between the Conservative and the Liberal Democrat parties, but this was unusual: the UK usually has a single-party majority government. Not every parliament forms a coalition government, for example the European parliament.

Coalitions composed of few parties

United Kingdom

In the United Kingdom, coalition governments (sometimes known as "national governments") usually have only been formed at times of national crisis. The most prominent was the National Government of 1931 to 1940. There were multi-party coalitions during both world wars. Apart from this, when no party has had a majority, minority governments normally have been formed with one or more opposition parties agreeing to vote in favour of the legislation which governments need to function: for instance the Labour government of James Callaghan formed a pact with the Liberals from March 1977 until July 1978, after a series of by-election defeats had eroded Labour's majority of three seats which had been gained at the October 1974 election. However, in the run-up to the 1997 general election, Labour opposition leader Tony Blair was in talks with Liberal Democrat leader Paddy Ashdown about forming a coalition government if Labour failed to win a majority at the election; but there proved to be no need for a coalition as Labour won the election by a landslide. The 2010 general election resulted in a hung parliament (Britain's first for 36 years), and the Conservatives, led by David Cameron, which had won the largest number of seats, formed a coalition with the Liberal Democrats in order to gain a parliamentary majority, ending 13 years of Labour government. This was the first time that the Conservatives and Lib Dems had made a power-sharing deal at Westminster. It was also the first full coalition in Britain since 1945, having been formed 70 years virtually to the day after the establishment of Winston Churchill's wartime coalition,
Labour and the Liberal Democrats have entered into a coalition twice in the Scottish Parliament, as well as twice in the Welsh Assembly.

Germany

In Germany, coalition governments are the norm, as it is rare for any single party to win a majority in parliament. The German political system makes extensive use of the constructive vote of no confidence, which requires governments to control an absolute majority of seats. Every government since the foundation of the Federal Republic in 1949 has involved at least two political parties. Typically, governments involve one of the two major parties forming a coalition with a smaller party. For example, from 1982 to 1998, the country was governed by a coalition of the CDU/CSU with the minor Free Democratic Party (FDP); from 1998 to 2005, a coalition of the Social Democratic Party of Germany (SPD) and the minor Greens held power. The CDU/CSU comprises an alliance of the Christian Democratic Union of Germany and Christian Social Union in Bavaria, described as "sister parties" which form a joint parliamentary group, and for this purpose are always considered a single party. Coalition arrangements are often given names based on the colours of the parties involved, such as "red-green" for the SPD and Greens. Coalitions of three parties are often named after countries whose flags contain those colours, such as the black-yellow-green Jamaica coalition.

Grand coalitions of the two major parties also occur, but these are relatively rare, as they typically prefer to associate with smaller ones. However, if the major parties are unable to assemble a majority, a grand coalition may be the only practical option. This was the case after the 2005 federal election, in which the incumbent SPD–Green government was defeated but the opposition CDU/CSU–FDP coalition also fell short of a majority. A grand coalition government was subsequently formed between the CDU/CSU and the SPD. Partnerships like these typically involve carefully structured cabinets: Angela Merkel of the CDU/CSU became Chancellor while the SPD was granted the majority of cabinet posts.

Coalition formation has become increasingly complex as voters increasingly migrate away from the major parties during the 2000s and 2010s. While coalitions of more than two parties were extremely rare in preceding decades, they have become common on the state level. These often include the liberal FDP and the Greens alongside one of the major parties, or "red–red–green" coalitions of the SPD, Greens, and The Left. In the eastern states, dwindling support for moderate parties has seen the rise of new forms of grand coalitions such as the Kenya coalition. By 2016, the Greens were participating eleven governing coalitions on the state level in seven different constellations. During campaigns, parties often declare which coalitions or partners they prefer or reject. This tendency toward fragmentation also spread to the federal level, particularly during the 2021 federal election, which saw the CDU/CSU and SPD fall short of a combined majority of votes for the first time in history.

Examples of coalitions

Armenia
Armenia became an independent state in 1991, following the collapse of the Soviet Union. Since then, many political parties were formed in it, who mainly work with each other to form coalition governments. The country was governed by the My Step Alliance coalition after successfully gaining a majority in the National Assembly of Armenia following the 2018 Armenian parliamentary election.

Australia
In federal Australian politics, the conservative Liberal, National, Country Liberal and Liberal National parties are united in a coalition, known simply as the Coalition. 

While nominally two parties, the Coalition has become so stable, at least at the federal level, that in practice the lower house of Parliament has become a two-party system, with the Coalition and the Labor Party being the major parties. This coalition is also found in the states of New South Wales and Victoria. In South Australia and Western Australia the Liberal and National parties compete separately, while in the Northern Territory and Queensland the two parties have merged, forming the Country Liberal Party, in 1978, and the Liberal National Party, in 2008, respectively.

Coalition governments involving the Labor Party and the Australian Greens have occurred at state and territory level, for example following the 2010 Tasmanian state election and the 2016 and 2020 Australian Capital Territory elections.

Belgium
In Belgium, a nation internally divided along linguistic lines (primarily between Dutch-speaking Flanders in the north and French-speaking Wallonia in the south, with Brussels also being by and large Francophone), each main political disposition (Social democracy, liberalism, right-wing populism, etc.) is, with the exception of the far-left Workers' Party of Belgium, split between Francophone and Dutch-speaking parties (e.g. the Dutch-speaking Vooruit and French-speaking Socialist Party being the two social-democratic parties). In the 2019 federal election, no party got more than 17% of the vote. Thus, forming a coalition government is an expected and necessary part of Belgian politics. In Belgium, coalition governments containing ministers from six or more parties are not uncommon; consequently, government formation can take an exceptionally long time. Between 2007 and 2011, Belgium operated under a caretaker government as no coalition could be formed.

Canada
In Canada, the Great Coalition was formed in 1864 by the Clear Grits, Parti bleu, and Liberal-Conservative Party. During the First World War, Prime Minister Robert Borden attempted to form a coalition with the opposition Liberals to broaden support for controversial conscription legislation. The Liberal Party refused the offer but some of their members did cross the floor and join the government. Although sometimes referred to as a coalition government, according to the definition above, it was not. It was disbanded after the end of the war.

During the 2008–09 Canadian parliamentary dispute, two of Canada's opposition parties signed an agreement to form what would become the country's second federal coalition government since Confederation if the minority Conservative government was defeated on a vote of non-confidence, unseating Stephen Harper as Prime Minister. The agreement outlined a formal coalition consisting of two opposition parties, the Liberal Party and the New Democratic Party. The Bloc Québécois agreed to support the proposed coalition on confidence matters for 18 months. In the end, parliament was prorogued by the Governor General, and the coalition dispersed before parliament was reconvened.

According to historian Christopher Moore, coalition governments in Canada became much less possible in 1919, when the leaders of parties were no longer chosen by elected MPs but instead began to be chosen by party members. Such a manner of leadership election had never been tried in any parliamentary system before. According to Moore, as long as that kind of leadership selection process remains in place and concentrates power in the hands of the leader, as opposed to backbenchers, then coalition governments will be very difficult to form. Moore shows that the diffusion of power within a party tends to also lead to a diffusion of power in the parliament in which that party operates, thereby making coalitions more likely.

Provincial
Several coalition governments have been formed within provincial politics. As a result of the 1919 Ontario election, the United Farmers of Ontario and the Labour Party, together with three independent MLAs, formed a coalition that governed Ontario until 1923.

In British Columbia, the governing Liberals formed a coalition with the opposition Conservatives in order to prevent the surging, left-wing Cooperative Commonwealth Federation from taking power in the 1941 British Columbia general election. Liberal premier Duff Pattullo refused to form a coalition with the third-place Conservatives, so his party removed him. The Liberal–Conservative coalition introduced a winner-take-all preferential voting system (the "Alternative Vote") in the hopes that their supporters would rank the other party as their second preference; however, this strategy backfired in the subsequent 1952 British Columbia general election where, to the surprise of many, the right-wing populist BC Social Credit Party won a minority. They were able to win a majority in the subsequent election as Liberal and Conservative supporters shifted their anti-CCF vote to Social Credit.

Manitoba has had more formal coalition governments than any other province. Following gains by the United Farmer's/Progressive movement elsewhere in the country, the United Farmers of Manitoba unexpectedly won the 1921 election. Like their counterparts in Ontario, they had not expected to win and did not have a leader. They asked John Bracken, a professor in animal husbandry, to become leader and premier. Bracken changed the party's name to the Progressive Party of Manitoba. During the Great Depression, Bracken survived at a time when other premiers were being defeated by forming a coalition government with the Manitoba Liberals (eventually, the two parties would merge into the Liberal-Progressive Party of Manitoba, and decades later, the party would change its name to the Manitoba Liberal Party). In 1940, Bracken formed a wartime coalition government with almost every party in the Manitoba Legislature (the Conservatives, CCF, and Social Credit; however, the CCF broke with the coalition after a few years over policy differences). The only party not included was the small, communist Labor-Progressive Party, which had a handful of seats.

In Saskatchewan, NDP premier Roy Romanow formed a formal coalition with the Saskatchewan Liberals in 1999 after being reduced to a minority. After two years, the newly elected Liberal leader David Karwacki  ordered the coalition be disbanded, the Liberal caucus disagreed with him and left the Liberals to run as New Democrats in the upcoming election. The Saskatchewan NDP was re-elected with a majority under its new leader Lorne Calvert, while the Saskatchewan Liberals lost their remaining seats and have not been competitive in the province since.

Denmark
From the creation of the Folketing in 1849 through the introduction of proportional representation in 1918, there were only single-party governments in Denmark. Thorvald Stauning formed his second government and Denmark's first coalition government in 1929. With the exception of a string of one-party governments during the 1970s, the norm since 1929 has been coalition governments. Every government from 1982 until the 2015 elections were coalitions. The most recent coalition was Løkke's third government, which was replaced by the one-party Frederiksen government in 2019.

When the Social Democrats under Stauning won 46% of the votes in the 1935 election, this was the closest any party has gotten to winning an outright majority in parliament. One party has thus never held a majority alone, and even one-party governments since 1918 have needed the support of at least one other party to govern. For example, the current government consists only of the Social Democrats, but also relies on the support of the Social Liberal Party, the Socialist People's Party, and the Red–Green Alliance.

Finland
In Finland, no party has had an absolute majority in the parliament since independence, and multi-party coalitions have been the norm. Finland experienced its most stable government (Lipponen I and II) since independence with a five-party governing coalition, a so-called "rainbow government". The Lipponen cabinets set the stability record and were unusual in the respect that both the centre-left (SDP) and radical left-wing (Left Alliance) parties sat in the government with the major centre-right party (National Coalition). The Katainen cabinet was also a rainbow coalition of a total of five parties.

India
Since India's Independence on 15 August 1947, Indian National Congress, the major political party instrumental in Indian independence movement, ruled the nation. The first Prime Minister Jawaharlal Nehru, second PM Lal Bahadur Shastri and the third PM Indira Gandhi, all were from the Congress party. However, Raj Narain, who had unsuccessfully contested election against Indira from the constituency of Rae Bareilly in 1971, lodged a case, alleging electoral malpractices. In June 1975, Indira was found guilty and barred by High Court from holding public office for six years. In response, an ungracious Emergency was declared under the pretext of national security. The next election's result was that India's first-ever coalition government was formed at the national level under the Prime Ministership of Morarji Desai, which was also the first non-Congress national government, which existed from 24 March 1977 to 15 July 1979, headed by the Janata Party, an amalgam of political parties opposed to Emergency imposed between 1975 and 1977. As the popularity of Janata Party dwindled, Morarji Desai had to resign and Chaudhary Charan Singh, a rival of Desai became the fifth PM. However, due to lack of support, this coalition government did not complete its five-year term.

Congress returned to the power in 1980 under Indira Gandhi, and later under Rajiv Gandhi as the 6th PM. However, the next general election of 1989 once again brought a coalition government under National Front, which lasted until 1991, with two Prime Ministers, the second one being supported by Congress. The 1991 election resulted in a Congress led stable minority government for five years. The next 11th parliament produced three Prime Ministers in two years and forced the country back to the polls in 1998. The first successful coalition government in India which completed the whole 5-year term was the Bharatiya Janata Party (BJP) led National Democratic Alliance with Atal Bihari Vajpayee as PM from 1999 to 2004. Then another coalition, Congress led United Progressive Alliance, consisting of 13 separate parties ruled India for two terms from 2004 to 2014 with Manmohan Singh as PM. However, in the 16th general election in May 2014, BJP secured majority on its own (first party to do so since 1984 election) and National Democratic Alliance came into power, with Narendra Modi as Prime Minister. In 2019, Narendra Modi got re-elected as Prime Minister for the second time as National Democratic Alliance again secured majority in the 17th general election.

Indonesia
As a result of the toppling of Suharto, political freedom is significantly increased. Compared to only three parties allowed to exist in the New Order era, a total of 48 political parties participated in the 1999 election, a total of 24 parties in the 2004 election, 38 parties in the 2009 election, and 15 parties in the 2014 election. There are no majority winner of those elections and coalition governments are inevitable. The current government is a coalition of seven parties led by the major centre-left PDIP to let governing big tent Onward Indonesia Coalition

Ireland
In Ireland, coalition governments are common; not since 1977 has a single party formed a majority government. Coalition governments to date have been led by either Fianna Fáil or Fine Gael. They have been joined in government by one or more smaller parties or independent members of parliament (TDs).

Ireland's first coalition government was formed after the 1948 general election, with five parties and independents represented at cabinet. Before 1989, Fianna Fáil had opposed participation in coalition governments, preferring single-party minority government instead. It formed a coalition government with the Progressive Democrats in that year.

The Labour Party has been in government on eight occasions. On all but one of those occasions, it was as a junior coalition party to Fine Gael. The exception was a government with Fianna Fáil from 1993 to 1994. The 29th Government of Ireland (2011–16), was a grand coalition of the two largest parties, as Fianna Fáil had fallen to third place in the Dáil.

The current government is a Fianna Fáil, Fine Gael and the Green Party. It is the first time Fianna Fáil and Fine Gael have served in government together, having derived from opposing sides in the Irish Civil War (1922–23).

Israel

A similar situation exists in Israel, which typically has at least 10 parties holding representation in the Knesset. The only faction to ever gain the majority of Knesset seats was Alignment, an alliance of the Labor Party and Mapam that held an absolute majority for a brief period from 1968 to 1969. Historically, control of the Israeli government has alternated between periods of rule by the right-wing Likud in coalition with several right-wing and religious parties and periods of rule by the center-left Labor in coalition with several left-wing parties. Ariel Sharon's formation of the centrist Kadima party in 2006 drew support from former Labor and Likud members, and Kadima ruled in coalition with several other parties.

Israel also formed a national unity government from 1984–1988. The premiership and foreign ministry portfolio were held by the head of each party for two years, and they switched roles in 1986.

Japan
In Japan, controlling a majority in the House of Representatives is enough to decide the election of the prime minister (=recorded, two-round votes in both houses of the National Diet, yet the vote of the House of Representatives decision eventually overrides a dissenting House of Councillors vote automatically after the mandatory conference committee procedure fails which, by precedent, it does without real attempt to reconcile the different votes). Therefore, a party that controls the lower house can form a government on its own. It can also pass a budget on its own. But passing any law (including important budget-related laws) requires either majorities in both houses of the legislature or, with the drawback of longer legislative proceedings, a two-thirds majority in the House of Representatives.

In recent decades, single-party full legislative control is rare, and coalition governments are the norm: Most governments of Japan since the 1990s and, as of 2020, all since 1999 have been coalition governments, some of them still fell short of a legislative majority. The Liberal Democratic Party (LDP) held a legislative majority of its own in the National Diet until 1989 (when it initially continued to govern alone), and between the 2016 and 2019 elections (when it remained in its previous ruling coalition). The Democratic Party of Japan (through accessions in the House of Councillors) briefly controlled a single-party legislative majority for a few weeks before it lost the 2010 election (it, too, continued to govern as part of its previous ruling coalition).

From the constitutional establishment of parliamentary cabinets and the introduction of the new, now directly elected upper house of parliament in 1947 until the formation of the LDP and the reunification of the Japanese Socialist Party in 1955, no single party formally controlled a legislative majority on its own. Only few formal coalition governments (46th, 47th, initially 49th cabinet) interchanged with technical minority governments and cabinets without technical control of the House of Councillors (later called "twisted Diets", nejire kokkai, when they were not only technically, but actually divided). But during most of that period, the centrist Ryokufūkai was the strongest overall or decisive cross-bench group in the House of Councillors, and it was willing to cooperate with both centre-left and centre-right governments even when it was not formally part of the cabinet; and in the House of Representatives, minority governments of Liberals or Democrats (or their precursors; loose, indirect successors to the two major pre-war parties) could usually count on support from some members of the other major conservative party or from smaller conservative parties and independents. Finally in 1955, when Hatoyama Ichirō's Democratic Party minority government called early House of Representatives elections and, while gaining seats substantially, remained in the minority, the Liberal Party refused to cooperate until negotiations on a long-debated "conservative merger" of the two parties were agreed upon, and eventually successful.

After it was founded in 1955, the Liberal Democratic Party dominated Japan's governments for a long period: The new party governed alone without interruption until 1983, again from 1986 to 1993 and most recently between 1996 and 1999. The first time the LDP entered a coalition government followed its third loss of its House of Representatives majority in the 1983 House of Representatives general election. The LDP-New Liberal Club coalition government lasted until 1986 when the LDP won landslide victories in simultaneous double elections to both houses of parliament.

There have been coalition cabinets where the post of prime minister was given to a junior coalition partner: the JSP-DP-Cooperativist coalition government in 1948 of prime minister Ashida Hitoshi (DP) who took over after his JSP predecessor Tetsu Katayama had been toppled by the left wing of his own party, the JSP-Renewal-Kōmei-DSP-JNP-Sakigake-SDF-DRP coalition in 1993 with Morihiro Hosokawa (JNP) as compromise PM for the Ichirō Ozawa-negotiated rainbow coalition that removed the LDP from power for the first time to break up in less than a year, and the LDP-JSP-Sakigake government that was formed in 1994 when the LDP had agreed, if under internal turmoil and with some defections, to bury the main post-war partisan rivalry and support the election of JSP prime minister Tomiichi Murayama in exchange for the return to government.

New Zealand 

MMP was introduced in New Zealand in the 1996 election. 
In order to get into power, parties need to get a total of 50% of the approximately (there can be more if an Overhang seat exists) 120 seats in parliament – 61. Since it is rare for a party to win a full majority, they must form coalitions with other parties. For example, during the 2017 general election, Labour won 46 seats and New Zealand First won nine. The two formed a Coalition Government with confidence and supply from the Green Party who won eight seats.

Spain 
Since 2015, there are many more coalition governments than previously in municipalities, autonomous regions and, since 2020 (coming from the November 2019 Spanish general election), in the Spanish Government. There are two ways of conforming them: all of them based on a program and its institutional architecture, one consists on distributing the different areas of government between the parties conforming the coalition and the other one is, like in the Valencian Community, where the ministries are structured with members of all the political parties being represented, so that conflicts that may occur are regarding competences and not fights between parties.

Coalition governments in Spain had already existed during the 2nd Republic, and have been common in some specific Autonomous Communities since the 80's. Nonetheless, the prevalence of two big parties overall has been eroded and the need for coalitions appears to be the new normal since around 2015.

Turkey 

Turkey's first coalition government was formed after the 1961 general election, with two political parties and independents represented at cabinet. It was also Turkey's first grand coalition as the two largest political parties of opposing political ideologies (Republican People's Party and Justice Party) united. Between 1960 and 2002, 17 coalition governments were formed in Turkey. The media and the general public view coalition governments as unfavorable and unstable due to their lack of effectiveness and short lifespan. Following Turkey's transition to a presidential system in 2017, political parties focussed more on forming electoral alliances. Due to separation of powers, the government doesn't have to be formed by parliamentarians and therefore not obliged to result in a coalition government. However, the parliament can dissolve the cabinet if the parliamentary opposition is in majority.

Uruguay 

Since the 1989 election, there have been 4 coalition governments, all including at least both the conservative National Party and the liberal Colorado Party. The first one was after the election of the blanco Luis Alberto Lacalle and lasted until 1992 due to policy disagreements, the longest lasting coalition was the Colorado-led coalition under the second government of Julio María Sanguinetti, in which the national leader Alberto Volonté was frequently described as a "Prime Minister", the next coalition (under president Jorge Batlle) was also Colorado-led, but it lasted only until after the 2002 Uruguay banking crisis, when the blancos abandoned the government. After the 2019 Uruguayan general election, the blanco Luis Lacalle Pou formed the coalición multicolor, composed of his own National Party, the liberal Colorado Party, the eclectic Open Cabildo and the center left Independent Party.

Support and criticism

Advocates of proportional representation suggest that a coalition government leads to more consensus-based politics, as a government comprising differing parties (often based on different ideologies) need to compromise about governmental policy. Another stated advantage is that a coalition government better reflects the popular opinion of the electorate within a country; this means, for instance, that the political system contains just one majority-based mechanism. Contrast this with district voting in which the majority mechanism occurs twice: first, the majority of voters pick the representative and, second, the body of representatives make a subsequent majority decision. The doubled majority decision undermines voter support for that decision. The benefit of proportional representation is that it contains that majority mechanism just once.

Those who disapprove of coalition governments believe that such governments have a tendency to be fractious and prone to disharmony, as their component parties hold differing beliefs and thus may not always agree on policy. Sometimes the results of an election mean that the coalitions which are mathematically most probable are ideologically infeasible, for example in Flanders or Northern Ireland. A second difficulty might be the ability of minor parties to play "kingmaker" and, particularly in close elections, gain far more power in exchange for their support than the size of their vote would otherwise justify.

Germany is the largest nation ever to have had proportional representation during the interbellum. After WW II, the German system, district based but then proportionally adjusted afterward, contains a threshold that keeps the number of parties limited. The threshold is set at five percent, resulting in empowered parties with at least a minimum amount of political gravity.

Coalition governments have also been criticized for sustaining a consensus on issues when disagreement and the consequent discussion would be more fruitful. To forge a consensus, the leaders of ruling coalition parties can agree to silence their disagreements on an issue to unify the coalition against the opposition. The coalition partners, if they control the parliamentary majority, can collude to make the parliamentary discussion on the issue irrelevant by consistently disregarding the arguments of the opposition and voting against the opposition's proposals — even if there is disagreement within the ruling parties about the issue. However, in winner-take-all this seems always to be the case.

Powerful parties can also act in an oligocratic way to form an alliance to stifle the growth of emerging parties. Of course, such an event is rare in coalition governments when compared to two-party systems, which typically exist because of stifling of the growth of emerging parties, often through discriminatory nomination rules regulations and plurality voting systems, and so on.

A single, more powerful party can shape the policies of the coalition disproportionately. Smaller or less powerful parties can be intimidated to not openly disagree. In order to maintain the coalition, they would have to vote against their own party's platform in the parliament. If they do not, the party has to leave the government and loses executive power. However, this is contradicted by the "kingmaker" factor mentioned above.

Finally, a strength that can also be seen as a weakness is that proportional representation puts the emphasis on collaboration. All parties involved are looking at the other parties in the best light possible, since they may be (future) coalition partners. The pendulum may therefore show less of a swing between political extremes. Still, facing external issues may then also be approached from a collaborative perspective, even when the outside force is not benevolent.

See also

 Cohabitation
 Collaborative leadership
 Electoral alliance
 Electoral fusion
 Government platform
 Hung parliament
 List of democracy and election-related topics
 List of countries with coalition governments
 Majority government
 Minority government
 Parliamentary system
 Plurality voting system
 Political coalition
 Political organisation
 :Category:Political party alliances
 Popular front
 Power sharing
 Unholy alliance
 United front

References

 

cs:Koalice#Vládní koalice